Mello is a comune (city) in the Italian province of Sondrio.

Attractions

Castle of the Queen

One of the attractions in Mello is the ruin of an early medieval castle called Castello della Regina (or Domòfole Castle) from around 1000 A.D., next to which are ruins of the chapel of Santa Maria Maddalena which was built toward the end of the 16th century.

References

Cities and towns in Lombardy